Live in Memphis may refer to:

Live in Memphis (Celine Dion video), 1998
Live in Memphis, a DVD by Elvis Costello and the Imposters, 2005
Live in Memphis, an album by Mr. Dibbs, 2000

See also
Elvis Recorded Live on Stage in Memphis, 1974